is a Japanese children's picture book author and illustrator. In 1983, he received the Mother Goose Award for the Most Exciting Newcomer to British Illustration for Angry Arthur (written by Hiawyn Oram). In 2000, his book, Sheep in Wolves' Clothing was made into the obscure HIT Entertainment series, Sheeep. He moved from Japan to London before returning to Tokyo in 2009.

Biography
Satoshi Kitamura was born in 1956 in Tokyo. After dropping out of school to pursue art, Kitamura decided not to attempt a 10-year apprenticeship as a potter and instead worked as a graphic artist. He was not trained as an artist, but at the age of 19 began to do commercial work as an illustrator for adverts and magazines.  He moved from Tokyo to London in 1979 where he worked mainly at designing greeting cards. More than twenty publishers declined his work until Klaus Flugge of Andersen Press asked him to illustrate Angry Arthur in 1981 after he had an exhibition of his work at the Neal Street Gallery in Covent Garden. Since then he has published more than 20 of his own books, as well as illustrating many more. 

He says that when he was young he read comics and admits that these have had a great influence on his style. He refers to Kamishibai as an early influence, as well as the story of Heinrich Schliemann told by a primary school teacher. His work is known for quirky perspectives, brilliant watercolours, attention to detail and unique characters and for regularly including animals or animal characters, most frequently cats. Boots the cat is a recurring Satoshi Kitamura character featuring in two board books and The Comic Adventures of Boots, a picture book whose style is reminiscent of graphic novels and comics.

Regular collaborators include Hiawyn Oram, Roger McGough and John Agard. Satoshi Kitamura worked with Colin McNaughton to create Once Upon an Ordinary School Day, published in 2004, In 2000, Sheep in Wolves' Clothing was adapted into an animated series by HIT Entertainment (who would later acquire Pingu, Fireman Sam and Thomas & Friends) that was animated by Grand Slamm Children's Films (who had also worked with HIT to animate Kipper, Percy the Park Keeper and Angelina Ballerina for CITV) and screened on CBBC, lasted 2 seasons, Starred Absolutely Fabulous actress, Julia Sawalha as the voice of the character, Georgina and silent character, Kid's various noises and also sold to overseas markets, including Australia.

In 2009 he left London and returned to Japan to care for his parents, but continues to travel and work for publishers across the globe. Apart from writing and illustrating children's books, Satoshi has been commissioned for various projects including Tokyo Underground posters, signage at Birmingham Children's Hospital and designing stationery. He also translates David McKee's Elmer the Patchwork Elephant series for the Japanese market.

Awards

the Mother Goose Award for the Most Exciting Newcomer to British Illustration for Angry Arthur, written by Hiawyn Oram. (1983)
the New York Times Notable Book of the Year for When Sheep Cannot Sleep 
the National Art Library Award (from the Victoria and Albert Museum for his illustrations in A Ring of Words, a poetry anthology edited by Roger McGough (1999)).
a Smarties Silver Award for Me and My Cat? (2000)

Reviews
‘The bold, bright, beautiful style of Satoshi Kitamura stands out like a beacon.’ (T.E.S.) ‘There could be no better way to start than with Kitamura’s wonderful illustrations.’ (Observer) ‘Satoshi Kitamura has produced some of the most delightful picture books of the last dozen years.’ (New York Times Book Review)

Books illustrated
Twinkle, Twinkle Firefly by John Agard, Grace Nichols, 2010
Tiger Dead! Tiger Dead! Stories from the Caribbean by John Agard, Grace Nichols, 2009
Millie's Marvellous Hat by Satoshi Kitamura, 2009, shortlisted for the Kate Greenaway Medal
The Young Inferno by John Agard, 2008
Let's Send an Efuto by Satoshi Kitamura, Motoko Matsuda, 2007
Stone Age Boy by Satoshi Kitamura, 2007
What's Wrong with My Hair? by Satoshi Kitamura, 2007
Efuto by Satoshi Kitamura, 2007
Play With Me!  by Satoshi Kitamura, 2007
Hello, Who's There? by Satoshi Kitamura, 2006
Jackdaw Jinx by Kathy Ashford, 2006
The Carnival of the Animals by Gerard Benson, Judith Chernaik, Cicely Herbert (editors), 2005
Pablo the Artist by Satoshi Kitamura 2005
Igor, the Bird that Couldn't Sing by Satoshi Kitamura, 2005
Once Upon an Ordinary School Day by Colin McNaughton, 2004
Hello H2O by John Agard, 2003
Einstein: The Girl Who Hated Maths by John Agard, 2002
Under the Moon and Over the Sea by John Agard, Grace Nichols (editors), Satoshi Kitamura (contributing illustrator), 2002
The Comic Adventures of Boots by Satoshi Kitamura 2002 review
For Every Child the Rights of the Child by Desmond Tutu (foreword) Satoshi Kitamura (contributor), 2000
Points of View with Professor Peekaboo by John Agard, 2000
Weblines  by John Agard, 2000
Me and My Cat? by Satoshi Kitamura, 1999
Kaze, Tsmetai Kaze, (The Wind, The Called Wind) by Leslie Norris, 1999
Morris MacMillipede - the Toast of Brussels Sprout by Mick Fitzmaurice, 1999
The Spotted Unicorn by Roger McGough, 1998
A Friend for Boots by Satoshi Kitamura, 1998
Bathtime Boots by Satoshi Kitamura, 1998
The Ring of Words, Roger McGough (editor), 1998
From the Devil's Pulpit by John Agard, 1997
Cat is Sleepy by Satoshi Kitamura, 1997
Dog is Thirsty by Satoshi Kitamura, 1997
Duck is Dirty by Satoshi Kitamura, 1997
Squirrel is Hungry by Satoshi Kitamura, 1997
Goldfish Hide And Seek by Satoshi Kitamura, 1997
Out of the Deep by Hiawyn Oram, 1996
Sheep in Wolves' Clothing by Satoshi Kitamura, 1996 (Adapted into a TV series by HIT Entertainment in 2000)
Paper Dinosaurs: A cut-out book by Satoshi Kitamura 1996
The adventures of Morris MacMillipede by Mick Fitzmaurice, 1996
Fly with the Birds: A word and rhyme book by Richard Edwards, 1996
We animals would like a word with you by John Agard, 1996
Eureka!: Me and my Body by Stephen Webster, 1994
Eureka!: Inside my House by Stephen Webster, 1994
Eureka!: Living and Working Together by Brenda Walpole, 1994
Eureka!: Hello, is anyone there? by Brenda Walpole, 1994
A Boy wants a Dinosaur by Hiawyn Oram, 1993
A Creepy Crawly Song Book by  Carl Lewis (music) Hiawyn Oram (lyrics), 1993
The Oxfam Book of Children's Stories: South and North,  East and West by Michael Rosen (editor), 1992
From Acorn to Zoo and Everything in Between In Alphabetical Order by Satoshi Kitamura, 1992
Lily takes a Walk by Satoshi Kitamura, 1991
Speaking for Ourselves by Hiawyn Oram, 1990
UFO Diary by Satoshi Kitamura, 1989
Ned and the Joybaloo by Hiawyn Oram, 1989
A Children's Chorus (anthology), 1989
Captain Toby by Satoshi Kitamura, 1988
When Sheep Cannot Sleep: The counting book by Satoshi Kitamura, 1988
In the Attic by Hiawyn Oram, 1988
My Friend Mr. Morris (Share-A-Story) by Pat Thomsen, 1988
Scrapyard by Andy Soutter, 1988
What's Inside: The Alphabet book by Satoshi Kitamura, 1987
The Happy Christmas Book (anthology) by Alison Sage (compiled by) Helen Wire (compiled by), 1987
Paper Jungle: A cut-out book by Satoshi Kitamura, 1986
The Flying Trunk  Naomi Lewis, 1986
Sky in the Pie by Roger McGough, 1985
The Great Games Book by Satoshi Kitamura (contributor)  1985
Angry Arthur by Hiawyn Oram, 1983

Refere me

External links
Satoshiland is a comprehensive fan site for Satoshi Kitamura. 
Illustrations by Satoshi Kitamura in The Guardian
The Guardian: "Postcard from Japan"
 

Japanese children's writers
Japanese illustrators
Living people
1956 births